Raymond Oliver Cruz Ilustre (born July 20, 1989), better known by his screen name Rayver Cruz, is a Filipino actor, dancer, singer, and host. He is the younger brother of fellow actor and dancer Rodjun Cruz.

Personal life
Rayver is a member of the Cruz family, a noted family line in the Philippine entertainment industry. He has two older brothers, Rodjun Cruz and Omar Cruz-Ilustre. His father, Rodolfo L. Ilustre, died in 2009 from kidney failure. He finished Grade 6 in Saint Mark's Institute in Las Pinas City.

He graduated in 2010 with a B.S. degree in Business Administration Management from St. Francis of Assisi College.

Rayver is also a cousin of Sheryl Cruz, Sunshine Cruz, Geneva Cruz and Donna Cruz.

Career
Cruz started as a former host together with his brother Rodjun in a children's magazine show 5 and Up on ABC (later TV5). In 1994, he moved to GMA Network and started as a child actor in the comedy show Kiss Muna, then moved to ABS-CBN in 2002 and became part of their contract talents before becoming a Star Magic talent.

His first lead role was in the 2005 primetime TV series Spirits as Red, with actress Maja Salvador. He played another lead role as Mythos in the 2007 primetime show Rounin.

On June 14, 2018, he left Star Magic, but he remained in Bagani, his final project at ABS-CBN. After 18 years, Cruz returned to his home network, GMA Network as he signed a contract on September 6, 2018. Aside from acting and dancing, he is given a big break in singing and hosting career when he hosted some GMA programs like the defunct variety show Studio 7, and singing competition The Clash along with Julie Anne San Jose.

Cruz is currently a part of variety show All-Out Sundays.

Filmography

Television

Movies

Discography

Singles
2007: "Kembot" (as part of ASAP)
2016: "Bitaw"
2023: "Pag-Ibig na Kaya" (with Julie Anne San Jose)

Appearances

Accolades

Awards and nominations

References

External links

1989 births
Living people
People from Las Piñas
Male actors from Metro Manila
Filipino male child actors
Filipino male television actors
Filipino television personalities
Filipino television presenters
Filipino television variety show hosts
Filipino people of Spanish descent
GMA Network personalities
Star Magic
ABS-CBN personalities
TV5 (Philippine TV network) personalities
Rayver
Filipino male film actors